Thomson Mason (14 August 173326 February 1785) was an American lawyer, planter and jurist. A younger brother of George Mason IV, United States patriot, statesman, and delegate from Virginia to the U.S. Constitutional Convention, Thomson Mason would father Stevens Thomson Mason (who after service in the American Revolutionary War followed his father's career into law and politics and eventually become a U.S. Senator from Virginia), and was the great-grandfather of Stevens T. Mason, first Governor of Michigan.

Early life
Mason was born at Chopawamsic in Stafford County, Virginia on 14 August 1733. Born to the First Families of Virginia, he was the third and youngest child of George Mason III and his wife Ann Stevens Thomson. Their father died in a ferry accident when his sons were boys, but their mother supervised operations of the family's plantations (farmed using enslaved labor) as well as acquired land in what became Prince William, Fairfax and Loudoun Counties for her younger sons (since primogeniture meant their eldest brother George would receive the lands his father inherited). Thomson Mason like his brothers received a private education suitable to his class, then traveled to Williamsburg, for studies at the College of William & Mary. He completed his education in England, at the Middle Temple in London.

Career

Upon returning to Virginia, Mason was admitted to the Virginia bar and developed a private legal practice. After marrying Mary King Barnes (d. 1771), the daughter of Col. Barnes of Leonardtown, Maryland across the Potomac River and a major local slave trader, Thomson Mason represented his father-in-law's interests in America during his frequent trips to England. In 1758 he also became Barnes' partner in some of the voyages in which Virginia or Maryland tobacco was shipped to Europe and slaves imported from Africa on the return journey.

Voters in Stafford County elected Mason several times as a burgess in the House of Burgesses. He served alongside Thomas Ludwell Lee in the 1756-1761 session, but neither man won re-election. Stafford County voters then elected (and re-elected) Mason to represent them along with John Alexander from 1766 until 1772, when he was replaced by Yelverton Peyton. 
 
In 1760, Mason had purchased a plantation he would call Raspberry Plain in Loudoun County, Virginia, which he operated (like Chopowamsic) using enslaved labor. Thomson built the mansion at Raspberry Plain in 1771, moved there after his first wife's death, and gained a reputation as a good host. Shortly before his death, Thomson Mason owned 47 slaves in Loudoun County. Upon Thomson's death, his eldest son Stevens Thomson Mason inherited Raspberry Plain. 

Thus, during the First Virginia Revolutionary Convention in 1774, Mason represented Loudoun County, together with fellow plantation owners Francis Peyton and Josias Clapham. However, Thomson Mason became the only delegate to oppose a nonimportation resolution, and decided to retire from public life, citing ill health. Nonetheless, his firstborn son and heir, Stevens Thomson Mason, served with distinction in the Continental Army.

Three years later, Loudoun County voters elected (and re-elected) Mason and Clapham as their (part-time) representatives in the Virginia House of Delegates during the 1777 and 1778 sessions. Then, the widower Mason rekindled a romance with Elizabeth Westwood, whose husband Wallace of Elizabeth City County, had also died. They married in November 1777, but the new bride came to consider Loudoun County nearly backcountry. Perhaps as a result of her influence, Elizabeth City County voters elected Mason as one of their representatives in the Virginia House of Delegates in early 1779, and refused to accept his resignation until the House found him ineligible and forced a new election, in which William Henry was elected to serve alongside John Tabb.

In 1778, fellow legislators elected Mason one of five judges in the General Court (now the Supreme Court of Virginia, alongside Joseph Jones, John Blair, Thomas Ludwell Lee and Paul Carrington. This would have made him ineligible for further legislative service.

Following the American Revolutionary War, and another legislative reorganization of the state judiciary, Stafford County voters again elected the ailing Mason as one of their representatives in the House of Delegates in 1783, and he served a final term alongside veteran legislator Charles Carter. There Mason became chairman of the Committee on Courts of Justice, but did not attempt re-election, dying at Raspberry Plain the following year.

Personal life
Mason married Mary King Barnes, the only daughter of Colonel Abraham Barnes and his wife Mary King, in 1758. He and Mary had four children:

Stevens Thomson Mason (29 December 1760–9 May 1803)
Abram Barnes Thomson Mason (24 August 1763–12 January 1813)
John Thomson Mason (15 March 1765–10 December 1824)
Ann Thomson Mason Chichester (26 February 1769–29 August 1817)

Mary died on 21 October 1771 in Prince William County, Virginia and was interred in the Mason family graveyard at Gunston Hall, but after Thomson's death was reinterred at Raspberry Plain per his instructions to their son Stevens Thomson Mason. Six years later on 23 November 1777, Mason married Elizabeth Westwood Wallace. He and Elizabeth had four children:

Dorothea "Anne" Anna Thomson Mason Hirst (10 April 1778–5 May 1822)
Westwood Thomson Mason (20 December 1780–1826)
William Temple Thomson Mason (24 July 1782–1862)
George Thomson Mason (died 1878)

Death and legacy
Mason died on 26 February 1785 at Raspberry Plain at the age of 51. His will directed that neither Westwood Thomson Mason nor William Temple Thomson Mason should reside "on the south side of the James River or below Williamsburg before they respectively attain the age of twenty-one years, lest they should imbibe more exalted notions of their own importance than I could wish any child of mine to possess." Furthermore, he wanted his first wife to be reinterred and buried beside him, and his late infant son George buried at his head. Part of the Raspberry Plain plantation survives today as part of the Catoctin Rural Historic District, although the house that Thomson Mason built and that his descendants altered, burned and was torn down in the early 20th century and replaced in 1910 by the current edifice in the Colonial Revival style.

References

1733 births
1785 deaths
18th-century American Episcopalians
American people of English descent
American planters
American slave owners
British North American Anglicans
Businesspeople from Virginia
Chief Justices of the Supreme Court of Virginia
George Mason
House of Burgesses members
Mason family
People from Leesburg, Virginia
People from Stafford County, Virginia
College of William & Mary alumni
Virginia lawyers
18th-century American politicians